Waiting for Anya is a children's novel by Michael Morpurgo, first published in Great Britain in 1990, by William Heinemann. It is set in Lescun, in a mountainous region of southern France on the border with Spain. It was shortlisted for the Carnegie Medal. It was adapted as a film of the same title released in 2020.

Characters
 Jo - The main character, a shepherd boy, around 12 years old.
 Benjamin - A Jew who smuggles other Jews across the border to Spain. He lost his daughter Anya, and is waiting for her to arrive in Lescun.
 Widow Horcada - A secretive old widow and Benjamin's mother in law. She is grumpy, but has a strong moral code.
 Grandpere- Jo's grandfather; involved in the smuggling of children.
 Hubert - A kind handicapped boy who is very good friends with Jo
 Papa - Jo's father, a prisoner of war (POW), who is in a German prison for most of the story and helps Jo smuggle the children to Spain.
 Rouf - Jo's faithful, cute, white, fluffy, dog.
 Michael - The leader of the Polish Jews, and the only one who interacts with Jo (through games of chess). He is noted to be extremely small, as he “looks about half [Jo's] age”, that is, 7 or 8 years old, despite being around the same age as Jo (15 years old).

Summary
The novel is set in the French village of Lescun during the Second World War.

Jo Lalande is a young shepherd who is enjoying his childhood; but when his father goes to fight in the war, Jo has to become the man of the house. After an incident with a bear, Jo meets a mysterious man in the forest. He follows the man to his home and learns his secret - he is a Jew named Benjamin who is waiting for his daughter Anya to come find him as they were split from each other, and he is responsible for smuggling Jewish children to safety across the border into Spain, with the help of his mother-in-law, the Widow Horcada. Jo starts to help them to prove that he can be trusted.

German soldiers move into town, and things become much more difficult. Although most of the town's inhabitants come to accept the German occupation, the task of getting the Jewish children across the border becomes more dangerous. Jo, his grandfather, Henri, Benjamin and the Widow Horcada devise a plan to get the children across. The plan requires the whole town to help the children escape, and relies on the German soldiers not noticing what is happening. But if they are caught, their lives will not be worth living...

After the children have been taken safely across into Spain, except for Benjamin and Léah. The bear that Benjamin saved earlier ends up getting him caught by the Germans. The German soldiers find them and take them to a concentration camp, where they are presumed to have died.

Shortly thereafter the war ends and Jo's grandpere marries the Madame. One day a telegram arrives from Anya who has found her way home.

Film adaptation

References

External links
Waiting for Anya - Michael Morpurgo.com

1990 British novels
British children's novels
Novels by Michael Morpurgo
Novels set during World War II
Heinemann (publisher) books
1990 children's books
Novels set in France